The independent state legislature theory or independent state legislature doctrine (ISL) posits that the Constitution of the United States delegates authority to regulate federal elections within a state to that state's elected lawmakers without any checks and balances from state courts, governors, or other bodies with legislative power (such as constitutional conventions or independent commissions). Advocates of ISL ground their interpretation in the Elections and Electors Clauses of the U.S. Constitution. Where state legislatures enact laws that conflict with their state constitutions, including provisions added to those constitutions through ballot initiatives passed by a state's citizens, proponents of ISL believe that state legislation rather than state constitutions take precedence. They also argue that only the federal courts, not state courts, can resolve conflicts between state laws and state constitutions with respect to administration of federal elections within a state.

The doctrine first appeared in legal arguments raised by attorneys for then-presidential candidate George W. Bush, seeking to stop the recount of votes in Florida during the 2000 U.S. presidential election. Most recently, the ISL theory has arisen in the context of congressional redistricting, the process whereby each state adopts new congressional districts every ten years using updated census data. In the case of Moore v. Harper, Republican state lawmakers in North Carolina have asked the U.S. Supreme Court to overrule the North Carolina Supreme Court's determination that congressional districts North Carolina lawmakers had drawn to favor Republican candidates in races for the U.S. Congress violated the North Carolina Constitution's prohibition on partisan gerrymandering.  The Court rejected ISL by majority opinion as recently as 2015, though four current Supreme Court justices have voiced interest in adopting some version of the doctrine. 

As a matter of constitutional interpretation, ISL is fiercely contested. While often defended on originalist grounds, numerous originalist scholars filed amicus briefs in Moore rejecting the theory with the Supreme Court.

Textual basis 
The primary textual basis for ISL in the U.S. Constitution derives from Article I, Section 4, Clause 1 (The Elections Clause):The Times, Places and Manner of holding Elections for Senators and Representatives, shall be prescribed in each State by the Legislature thereof; but the Congress may at any time by Law make or alter such Regulations, except as to the Places of chusing [sic] Senators. [emphasis added]
Proponents of ISL derive additional textual support from the Presidential Electors Clause's mention of state legislatures in Article II, Section 1, Clause 2:Each State shall appoint, in such Manner as the Legislature thereof may direct, a Number of Electors, equal to the whole Number of Senators and Representatives to which the State may be entitled in the Congress: but no Senator or Representative, or Person holding an Office of Trust or Profit under the United States, shall be appointed an Elector. [emphasis added]The phrase, "the Legislature thereof" in both the Electors Clause and the Elections Clause is interpreted under ISL to refer specifically to a state's elected representative body, not other parts of the state government.

Role of Charles Pinckney 
Charles Pinckney, then a delegate of the Constitutional Convention, and otherwise an active member of South Carolina's government; purportedly suggested the following clause in 1787, which was reported to the United States Secretary of State John Quincy Adams in an 1818 draft of his notes.

"Each State shall prescribe the time & manner of holding Elections by the People for the house of Delegates & the House of Delegates shall be the judges of the Elections returns & Qualifications of their members."

The appellants of Moore v. Harper cite Pinckney's report to Adams — the so-called "Pinckney Plan" — as supporting their claims, but some scholars have concluded that the document on which this argument relies is "fraudulent."

Interpretation of the theory 
No majority ruling of the U.S. Supreme Court has explicitly relied on ISL to determine the outcome of a case, and the Court has expressly rejected the doctrine at least once in Arizona State Legislature v. Arizona Independent Redistricting Commission (2015).

19th century 
During the Massachusetts Constitutional Convention of 1820–1821, James T. Austin proposed including a provision in the Massachusetts Constitution that would limit the power of the Massachusetts legislature to redraw new congressional districts every two years. This proposal was rejected by other convention delegates as in violation of the Elections Clause of the U.S. Constitution, with delegate Justice Joseph Story arguing that such an amendment would amount to the Convention "assuming a control over the Legislature which the constitution of the United States does not justify."

In 1873, the Supreme Court of Mississippi ruled that a provision of the Mississippi Constitution requiring all general elections to be held biannually did not limit Mississippi's legislature's discretion to set the timing of congressional elections under the Elections Clause.

The Supreme Court of the United States indicated some approval for ISL in dicta from its 1892 ruling in McPherson v. Blacker. In that case, the Court assessed the constitutionality of a Michigan law regulating the selection of presidential electors. In upholding the law, the Court quoted approvingly from an 1874 Senate committee report containing language recognizing the absolute power of state legislatures to appoint presidential electors. The committee report went on to say that such power "cannot be taken from them or modified by their State constitutions." However, because the issue before the court in Blacker was whether the Michigan law was consistent with the federal constitution, the court made no direct holding addressing ISL.

20th century 
Throughout most of the 20th century, both state courts and the Supreme Court of the United States largely ignored or rejected ISL. For example, in 1916, the Supreme Court ruled in State of Ohio ex rel. Davis v. Hildebrant that an amendment to the Ohio Constitution allowing the public to reverse the state legislature's laws was constitutional, even when reversing the legislature's adoption of new congressional districts. The Court did not invoke the Elections Clause or other ISL principles in its reasoning. In 1932 the Supreme Court ruled in Smiley v. Holm that the U.S. Constitution does not forbid a governor from vetoing a redistricting proposal passed by the state legislature.

The modern revival of interest in ISL at the Supreme Court stems from Bush v. Gore, specifically from a three-Justice concurring opinion in that case written by Chief Justice Rehnquist. In agreeing with the majority's invalidation of the Florida Supreme Court's order of a statewide manual recount of ballots cast in the 2000 presidential election, the Chief Justice argued that the Court's holding was further supported by the fact that the Florida Supreme Court's ruling significantly departed from the statutory text of Florida's election code—a violation of the Elections Clause.

Arizona State Legislature v. Arizona Independent Redistricting Commission 
In 2015, the Supreme Court expressly rejected the ISL in a 5–4 ruling in Arizona State Legislature v. Arizona Independent Redistricting Commission. In that case, the Court considered the constitutionality of the authority granted to an independent commission to draw congressional districts for the state of Arizona. The commission was created by initiative in which the Arizona electorate voted to amend the state constitution to remove the power of congressional redistricting from the state legislature. The Arizona State Legislature filed suit, arguing that reassigning the power to draw congressional maps away from an elected state legislature violated the Elections Clause. The Court rejected this argument. In a majority opinion written by Justice Ruth Ginsburg, the Court ruled that the Election's Clause language "the Legislature thereof" can refer either to the legislative authority of a state's representative body or a state citizenry's use of popular initiative (if consistent with the state's constitution).

Chief Justice John Roberts dissented in the case, joined by Justices Antonin Scalia, Clarence Thomas, and Samuel Alito. The Chief Justice argued that the text, structure, and history of the Constitution required reading the Elections Clause as assigning the duty of regulating federal elections within a state specifically upon that state's elected represented bodies. According to the Chief Justice, this interpretation is the only way to make structural sense of the necessity of the Seventeenth Amendment to the U.S. Constitution, which amended the Constitution to require elections of U.S. Senators "by the people" of each state, replacing the former language granting such power to "the Legislature" of each state. In rejecting the majority's reasoning, the Chief Justice commented ironically on the amendment's ratification efforts: "What chumps! Didn't they realize that all they had to do was interpret the constitutional term 'the Legislature' to mean 'the people'?".

2020 presidential election and 2022 midterm elections 

Since the 2020 United States presidential election, four conservative justices of the Supreme Court have indicated sympathy for ISL.

In a federal case challenging Wisconsin's absentee voter laws, Justices Brett Kavanaugh and Neil Gorsuch voiced interest in adopting the doctrine. Specifically, Justice Kavanaugh wrote in favor of ISL as derived from the Presidential Electors Clause, writing "The text of Article II means that the clearly expressed intent of the legislature must prevail and that a state court may not depart from the state election code enacted by the legislature." In another opinion in the same case, Justice Gorsuch (also joined by Justice Kavanaugh) argued that the Elections Clause "provides that state legislatures—not federal judges, not state judges, not state governors, not other state officials—bear primary responsibility for setting election rules."

More recently, Justice Alito, joined by Justices Thomas and Gorsuch, dissented in a denial of an application for a stay of a ruling by the North Carolina Supreme Court. The state supreme court's ruling invalidated the North Carolina General Assembly's adoption of a congressional map for the 2022 U.S. midterm elections and ordered the implementation of a judicially created map, on the grounds that it was an extreme case of gerrymandering in favor of the Republican Party. The dissent maintained that the North Carolina judiciary's actions were worthy of review by the Court, arguing that "[the Elections Clause's] language specifies a particular organ of a state government [for prescribing the rules for congressional elections], and we must take that language seriously." The Court agreed to review the case during the 2022–2023 term as Moore v. Harper.

Theory

Justifications 
While all ISL proponents rely on the text and history of the Elections Clause and the Presidential Electors Clause, Professor Michael Morley has offered additional normative arguments in favor of ISL's grant of authority to state legislatures. Morley argues:

 ISL allows state legislatures greater flexibility in responding to local needs and exigencies where state constitutions would otherwise "shackle legislatures' discretion."
 The ultimate responsibility for regulating elections should be in the hands of the political branches of government to ensure political accountability for the outcomes of elections.
 ISL preserves the shared and symmetrical power to regulate federal elections between Congress and state legislatures, which was the original purpose of the Elections Clause. When state constitutions or state judiciaries usurp this regulative power, the authority of state legislatures over federal elections is reduced, and Congress's regulative power becomes asymmetrically enlarged.
 ISL reduces confusion and conflict over the validity of state-run federal elections because other states and the federal government would not need to worry about the validity of a state legislature's actions under that state's constitution. Where a legislature's actions are not subject to override by a State Supreme Court, for example, it would be easier to be certain about the elections regulations that that legislature enacts.

Criticism 
ISL has come under criticism on originalist and other grounds. Conservative former federal appellate judge J. Michael Luttig has written that "there is absolutely nothing to support" the ISL. American legal scholar Vikram Amar argues that ISL construes the concept of the state legislature as implausibly isolated from other state institutions, including state constitutions: "[T]he meaning of state 'legislature' was well accepted and bore a clear public understanding at the Founding: A state 'legislature' was an entity created and constrained by its state constitution." Amar argues further that constraints placed upon state legislatures' authority over elections by public referendums and initiatives are consistent with the Founding-era understanding of the role of state legislatures: "state legislatures were not independent sovereign entities; they were then, and state legislatures remain today, delegatees of the sovereign power of the people." Other legal scholars consider ISL to be "fatally inconsistent with basic precepts of both federalism and the separation of powers" as well as "an unprecedented, unconstitutional, and potentially chaos-inducing intrusion into state election law."

Practically, ISL would mean that the general public (through ballot initiatives), governors (elected statewide and so not affected by district borders) and state courts would have no role in altering election laws or federal congressional boundaries, even if they violate the state constitution, with the legislature "kind of liberated from all the other checks and balances that we would ordinarily find within state government." Adoption of the ISL would create substantial confusion about the validity of a number of state election laws and regulations. In an amicus brief submitted for Moore v. Harper, a bipartisan group of former public officials and federal judges argued that "a broad view of the so-called independent state legislature theory ... would essentially hand the future of democratic representation in the states to those motivated to entrench political power in a single party."

See also 
 Attempts to overturn the 2020 United States presidential election
 Democratic backsliding in the United States
 Republican efforts to restrict voting following the 2020 presidential election
 Voter suppression in the United States

References 

United States constitutional law
Theories of constitutional interpretation
United States election law